Home Made is a 1927 American silent comedy film directed by Charles Hines and starring Johnny Hines, Margaret Seddon and DeWitt Jennings.

Cast
 Johnny Hines as Johnny White 
 Margaret Seddon as Mrs. White 
 DeWitt Jennings as Mr. White 
 Maude Turner Gordon as Mrs. Fenton 
 Edmund Breese as Mr. Tilford 
 Marjorie Daw as The Girl 
 Charles K. Gerrard as Robert Van Dorn

References

Bibliography
 Munden, Kenneth White. The American Film Institute Catalog of Motion Pictures Produced in the United States, Part 1. University of California Press, 1997.

External links

1927 films
1927 comedy films
Silent American comedy films
Films directed by Charles Hines
American silent feature films
1920s English-language films
American black-and-white films
First National Pictures films
1920s American films